The Affair at Little Wokeham is a 1943 detective novel by the Irish writer Freeman Wills Crofts. It is the twenty-fourth in his series of novels featuring Inspector French, a prominent figure of the Golden Age of Detective Fiction. It was published in the United States under the alternative title of Double Tragedy.

References

Bibliography
 Evans, Curtis. Masters of the "Humdrum" Mystery: Cecil John Charles Street, Freeman Wills Crofts, Alfred Walter Stewart and the British Detective Novel, 1920-1961. McFarland, 2014.
 Herbert, Rosemary. Whodunit?: A Who's Who in Crime & Mystery Writing. Oxford University Press, 2003.
 Reilly, John M. Twentieth Century Crime & Mystery Writers. Springer, 2015.

1943 British novels
Novels by Freeman Wills Crofts
British crime novels
British mystery novels
British thriller novels
British detective novels
Hodder & Stoughton books
Novels set in England
Irish mystery novels
Irish crime novels